The 2016–17 Championnat LNA season was the 86th season of the top tier basketball league in Switzerland. Monthey won its third national championship.

Competition format
All teams played two times against each other for completing 20 games per team.

The six first qualified teams joined the group for places 1 to 6 while the other five teams will play the group for places 7 to 11. These two groups will be played with a one-legged round-robin format, where all teams from group 1 to 6 and the two first qualified teams from the group for the seventh position will be qualified for the playoffs. In this intermediate stage, teams start with the points accumulated by the winnings achieved in the first stage.

The quarterfinals and the semifinals were played as a best-of-five series while the final in a best-of-seven series.

Teams 

BBC Lausanne
BC Winterthur
Boncourt
Fribourg Olympic
Lions de Genève
Lugano Tigers
Monthey
5 Stelle Massagno
Starwings Basket Regio Basel
Swiss Central Basket
Union Neuchâtel

Regular season

Intermediate stage

Group 1–6

Group 7–11

Play-offs
Seeded teams played at home games 1, 2 and 5.

Source:

References

External links 
 

Championnat LNA seasons
Swiss
basketball
basketball